Capes of Kimberley coastline of Western Australia are located along the Kimberley coastline of Western Australia from the border with the Northern Territory in the north east of the Kimberley land region around to south of Broome.

Notes

References

Kim
Kimberley coastline of Western Australia
Western Australia geography-related lists